The Essex Handicap is a Grade III American Thoroughbred horse race for four-year-olds and older at a distance of one and one-sixteenth miles on the dirt run annually in March at Oaklawn Park Race Track in Hot Springs, Arkansas.  The event currently offers a purse of $500,000.

History

Southland Handicap
The event was inaugurated on 13 March 1948 as the Southland Handicap a $5,000 handicap event for three-year-olds and older and was won by William H. Bishop owner and trained six-year-old Boden's Pal in a time 1:43. William H. Bishop was from Anna, Illinois where prior to World War II he ran a Horse & Mule Auction and then later become a leading horse trainer in Illinois.

Illinois horsemen had an impact on the early runnings of the event. The 1949 running was won by Mrs. Emil Denemark's entry of three-year-old Provocative and Enforcer in a small four horse field. Members from Emil Denemark's family would win the event five times in the first 13 runnings of the event including Racetracker who won the event twice. Emil Denemark was an established horse breeder from Lisle, Illinois who passed away in 1963.

Another horse in this era to make an impact was the dual winner Little Imp who won in 1953 and 1955. The son of the 1943 Arkansas Derby winner Seven Hearts also finished second in 1952 and third in 1954. In 1954 the distance of the event was decreased to 1 mile and 70 yards.

In 1956 the event was scheduled to be run on Saturday, March 17 but it was not held. In 1957 the winner Sir Tribal set a new track record for the 1 mile and 70 yards distance in 1:40 flat. The event had become a preparatory race for the Oaklawn Handicap, the premier event for old horses which would be held usually one two weeks following the Southland Handicap. Although the distance of the event was shortened to six furlongs only for the 1960 running, the winner Little Fitz would be the first horse to win the Southland–Oaklawn Handicap double in the same year although there had been earlier placegetters of the event who did win the Oaklawn Handicap.

In 1966 the event was won by 1965 Arkansas Derby winner Swift Ruler who set a new track record for the 1 mile and 70 yards distance in 1:39. Swift Ruler would go on and win a unique treble by winning the Razorback Handicap and then the Oaklawn Handicap. 

In 1972 the winner of the event, Sado carried 125 lbs, the highest weight by a winner. Sado became the third horse to win the event for the second  time as the 6/5 favorite winning by a half length margin in a field of nine.

Essex Handicap
 
In 1973 the Oaklawn Park administration renamed the event to the Essex Handicap in honor of the former racetrack Essex Park which was also located in Hot Springs, Arkansas and was destroyed by fire in the early 20th century. In 1976 the conditions of the event were changed that three-year-old could not be entered since there were new events available specifically for them.

In 1985 the event was upgraded to a Grade III by the American Graded Stakes Committee. In 1987 the distance of the event was increased by forty yards to one and one-sixteenth miles. Sun Master, winner of the event at the new distance at 1:41 flat continues to hold the stakes record to date. In 1992 the event was scheduled for the first time February.

After twenty-three runnings of the event as Grade III the event lost its graded status for the 2008 running. 

With increased revenue from the racino the administration of the track in 2017 began increasing the purse offered for the event. In 2017 the event offered $250,000 and by 2021 an attractive purse of $500,000 was up for grabs. This increase in stakes started to attract much more accomplished gallopers and the American Graded Stakes Committee restored the event back to Grade III for 2022.

Records

Speed record:
 miles: 1:41.00   – Sun Master (1987)
1 miles & 70 yards:  1:39.40  – Swift Ruler  (1966)

Margins:
7 lengths – Silver Goblin (1995)

Most wins:
 2 – Little Imp  (1953, 1955) 
 2 – Racetracker (1958, 1959) 
 2 – Sado (1971, 1972)
 2 – Rated R Superstar (2019, 2022)

Most wins by an owner:
 5 – Denemark Family (1949, 1952, 1958, 1959, 1961) 

Most wins by a jockey:
 3 – Garth Patterson (1977, 1979, 1981)
 3 – Pat Day (1991, 1992, 1993)
 3 – Calvin H. Borel (1998, 2007, 2011)
 3 – Luis S. Quinonez (2000, 2003, 2012)
 3 – Ricardo Santana Jr. (2014, 2013, 2021)

Most wins by a trainer:
 3 – D. Wayne Lukas (1987, 1991, 2023)

Southland / Essex Handicap – Oaklawn Handicap double:
 Little Fitz (1960), Wa-Wa Cy (1963), Gay Revoke (1965), Swift Ruler (1966), Warbucks (1975), Silver State (2021)

Winners

Notes:

§ Ran as an entry

See also
List of American and Canadian Graded races

External sites
Oaklawn Park Media Guide 2020

References

Horse races in Arkansas
Graded stakes races in the United States
Grade 3 stakes races in the United States
Open mile category horse races
Oaklawn Park
Recurring sporting events established in 1948
1948 establishments in Arkansas